Miralia is a genus of snakes belonging to the family Homalopsidae.

The species of this genus are found in Southeastern Asia.

Species
Species:
 Miralia alternans (Reuss, 1834)

References

Homalopsidae
Snake genera